Rajeev Kumar Singh may refer to
 Rajeev Kumar Singh (Bihar politician)
 Rajeev Kumar Singh (Dataganj politician)
 Rajeev Kumar Singh (Dariyabad politician), (1952–2022)